The Christopher Cadbury Wetland Reserve is a nature reserve of the Worcestershire Wildlife Trust. It is situated near Upton Warren, between Bromsgrove and Droitwich Spa in Worcestershire, England. The reserve is designated a Site of Special Scientific Interest.

Description
The reserve, area , is named in recognition of Christopher Cadbury, who purchased much of the land and paid for many developments and improvements. It is known as a birdwatching site, and there are several bird hides.

Moors pools
The Moors pools, in the north, are freshwater lakes where there was once agricultural land. A range of wildfowl can be seen here, and it is a breeding place for species including black-headed gull, oystercatcher, lapwing and Cetti's warbler. Snipe and water rail can be seen in winter.

The Flashes
The Flashes, in the south, are saline pools in areas where brine extraction caused subsidence. There are plants typical of a salt marsh. Species of waders, both breeding and passage birds, may be seen. Scarce species have been spotted, such as ruff, sanderling, turnstone and whimbrel.

Links and biodiversity
The Trust believes that links between areas of countryside are beneficial for biodiversity; it notes that this reserve is next to the Forest of Feckenham Living Landscape area, and is a link between the Droitwich Canal wetlands, the Worcester and Birmingham Canal, the River Salwarpe and the River Severn.

References

External links
 The Christopher Cadbury Wetland Reserve at Upton Warren Leaflet by Worcestershire Wildlife Trust

Nature reserves in Worcestershire
Wetlands of England
Sites of Special Scientific Interest in Worcestershire
Birdwatching sites in England